Brockhill Park Performing Arts College (BPPAC) is a coeducational secondary school and sixth form located in Saltwood, Kent near the coastal town of Hythe. The school is located next to Brockhill Country Park and includes a farm. Brockhill is known not only for its farm, but its performing arts status and tough cross country running course as well as its neighbouring country park. It is a specialist Performing Arts College with a rural dimension.

References

External links
 Brockhill Park Performing Arts College

Secondary schools in Kent
Academies in Kent
Specialist arts colleges in England